Camptocosa is a genus of spiders in the family Lycosidae. It was first described in 2005 by Dondale, Jiménez & Nieto. , it contains 2 species.

References

Lycosidae
Araneomorphae genera
Spiders of North America